Ali Abdollahzadeh (born January 4, 1993) is an Iranian footballer who last played for Iranian club Paykan as a defender.

Career

Tractor
On 12 June 2018, Abdollahzadeh signed a three-year contract with Tractor.

Club career statistics

References

External links
 Ali Abdollahzadeh at IranLeague.ir
 Ali Abdollahzadeh at Footballtehran.com
Ali abdollahzadeh at Soccerway
Ali Abdollahzadeh On Instagram

1993 births
Living people
Iranian footballers
Association football defenders
People from Abadan, Iran
Pars Jonoubi Jam players
Sportspeople from Khuzestan province